Samuel Autey Cookson (6 September 1868, Chorley, Lancashire, England, UK – 27 February 1947, Bridgwater, Somerset, England, UK), known as S.A. Cookson, was an English stage and film actor. He appeared in the 1899 film King John, adapted by Herbert Beerbohm Tree.

External links

1868 births
1947 deaths
People from Chorley
Male actors from Lancashire
English male stage actors
English male silent film actors
20th-century English male actors